Greener is a surname. Notable people with the surname include:

 Bob Greener (1899–1970), English professional footballer
 Christopher Greener (born 1943), United Kingdom's tallest human
 Matthew Greener, British musician
 Richard Theodore Greener (1844–1922), American diplomat
 William Greener (1806–1869), English inventor and gunsmith

See also
 "Greener", rock song by the American rock band Tally Hall
 Greener, 1994 stop-motion film directed by Mark Osborne.
 W.W. Greener, English arms-making firm